Sándor Falvai (born in Ózd, 1949) is a Hungarian pianist.

Falvai graduated in 1972 at the Ferenc Liszt Academy of Music, where he was appointed a teacher after spending a year at the Moscow Conservatory. He has performed and recorded internationally, and served as soloist for the Budapest Symphony Orchestra in concert tours.

References
  Naxos Records

Hungarian classical pianists
Male classical pianists
1949 births
Living people
21st-century classical pianists
21st-century Hungarian male musicians